Thondarampet West is a village in the Orathanadu taluk of Thanjavur district, Tamil Nadu, India. This village is famous for National Level Kabaddi Match. Thondarampet West village is located in Orathanadu Tehsil of Thanjavur district in Tamil Nadu, India. As per 2009 stats, Thondarampattu is the gram panchayat of Thondarampet West village. 

Thondarampet West has a total population of 1,888 peoples. There are about 475 houses in Thondarampet West village. Orathanadu is nearest town to Thondarampet West.

Demographics 

As per the 2001 census, Thondarampet West had a total population of 1712 with 819 males and 893 females. The sex ratio was 1090. The literacy rate was 70.78.

References 

 

Villages in Thanjavur district